Horizon Europe is a 7-year European Union scientific research initiative, successor of the Horizon 2020 programme and the earlier Framework Programmes for Research and Technological Development. The European Commission drafted and approved a plan for Horizon Europe to raise EU science spending levels by 50% over the years 2021–2027.

Budget
The budget of €95.5 billion for Horizon Europe, which was launched in 2021, is up from €77 billion for the Horizon 2020.

Independent observers had predicted the final approved funding to be much lower after completion of the lengthy negotiations with the European Parliament and EU member states. Former EU commissioner for Research, Science and Innovation Carlos Moedas, along with many advocacy groups, had pushed for a more expansive EU science budget. In order to build political support for the budget increase, he used American originated ideas of "moonshots" to focus research efforts and boost the public interest.

Details
The proposal called for €100 billion in research and innovation spending for years 2021–2027. Of that sum, €2.4 billion is earmarked for the Euratom nuclear research programme and €3.6 billion is put away for an umbrella investment fund, called InvestEU. After accounting for 2% annual inflation, in 2018 the funding for Horizon Europe amounted to €86.6 billion.

Wealthier EU members have expressed opposition to the increase in funding, with Dutch prime minister Mark Rutte saying the draft budget was "unacceptable".

To pay for the €100 billion science spending, the Commission's plan calls for cuts to agriculture and cohesion funding by 5 per cent. Additionally, the plan seeks to tie funding to adherence to the rule of law in member states, including judicial independence.

Compared to the previous framework programme Horizon 2020, some changes in terms of cost reporting have been implemented with the objective to simplify the grant management process.

Cooperation beyond the EU
Horizon Europe supports European partnerships in which the EU, national authorities and/or the private sector jointly commit to support the development and implementation of a programme of research and innovation activities. Horizon Europe expanded its partnerships beyond the 27 member states of the EU, this includes:
 In October 2021, Ukraine joined as an associate member. The Agreement entered into force in June 2022 and "associated third country" status was applied retroactively from 1 January 2021.
 In November 2021, Armenia joined as an associate member. The Agreement entered into force in February 2022 and "associated third country" status was applied retroactively from 1 January 2021.
 In December 2021, Israel, Georgia, Bosnia and Herzegovina, Kosovo, Montenegro, North Macedonia, and Serbia became associate members.
 In August 2022, the United Kingdom launched formal dispute resolution proceedings over its access to the programme.
 In December 2022, New Zealand joined as an associate member.
 Switzerland currently has "non-associated third country" status. For those parts of the programme where Switzerland is eligible to participate, funding for the Swiss partners is provided directly by the Swiss government.

See also
 Science and technology in Europe

References

External links
 Horizon Europe official website

European Commission projects